This article is a listing of Sayuri Ishikawa's recordings from her career.  Ishikawa has released recordings from Nippon Columbia (1973–1993), Pony Canyon (1993–1999) and Teichiku Records (2000–present).

Discography

Singles

Nippon Columbia singles

Pony Canyon singles

Teichiku singles

Other singles

Other songs

Albums

Studio albums

Live albums

Compilation albums

Remix albums

Box sets

Recordings of theatrical works

Other appearances

Notes

External links 
 
 Ishikawa's site by Teichiku

Discographies of Japanese artists